Baranyi is a surname. Notable people with the surname include:

 John Baranyi (born 1961), Independent candidate in 2000 and Green Party candidate in 2003 and 2004 for the House of Commons of Canada
 Szabolcz Baranyi (born 1944 in Nagyvárad, Hungary (now Oradea, Romania)), a former professional tennis player from Hungary